Ybeltje Berckmoes-Duindam (born 11 February 1967) is a retired Dutch politician who served as a member of the House of Representatives from 9 November 2011 to 23 March 2017. A member of the People's Party for Freedom and Democracy (Volkspartij voor Vrijheid en Democratie – VVD), she replaced demissionary Ineke Dezentjé Hamming-Bluemink and was elected to a full parliamentary term during the 2012 Dutch general election. She did not seek reelection in the 2017 election.

Born in Leiden, she previously served as a member of the municipal council of Den Helder from 2006 to 2011 with a brief interruption in 2010. She resides in Julianadorp, town part of the municipality of Den Helder.

References

External links
  Ybeltje Berckmoes-Duindam personal website
  House of Representatives biography

1967 births
Living people
Dutch pharmacists
Members of the House of Representatives (Netherlands)
Municipal councillors in North Holland
People from Den Helder
People from Leiden
People's Party for Freedom and Democracy politicians
University of Amsterdam alumni
21st-century Dutch politicians
21st-century Dutch women politicians
Women pharmacists